Frederick William Rose (26 December 1919 – 27 March 1988) was an Australian rules footballer who played with Carlton in the Victorian Football League (VFL).

After initially serving in the Army Reserve, Fred Rose enlisted in the Australian Army in April 1943 and served until late 1945, including a for four-month stint in the Solomon Islands.

While serving in the Army, Rose played for Carlton in the first two rounds of the 1945 VFL season, remaining with the club through 1946 but never again playing for the senior team.

In October 1946 Frederick Rose married Nancye Marie McGeachin (1924–1998) and they subsequently lived on farms near Sea Lake, Wangaratta and Moama.

Notes

External links 

Fred Rose's profile at Blueseum

1919 births
1988 deaths
Carlton Football Club players
Australian rules footballers from Victoria (Australia)